Buffalo Virgin is the second album by the Icelandic metal band HAM, and their first full-length LP. It was the only one of their albums to be released by a non-Icelandic label, One Little Indian. It includes a cover of ABBA's Voulez-Vous.

Track listing
"Slave" (words: Óttarr Proppé, music: Sigurjón Kjartansson)
"Youth" (words: Jón Gnarr, music: Sigurjón Kjartansson)
"Voulez Vous" (words and music: Benny Andersson, Björn Ulvaeus)
"Linda Blair" (words: Óttarr Proppé, music: Sigurjón Kjartansson)
"Svin" (words: Óttarr Proppé, music: Sigurjón Kjartansson)
"Whole Lotta Love" (words: Óttarr Proppé, music: Sigurjón Kjartansson)
"Misery" (words and music: Sigurjón Kjartansson)
"Egg Ya Hummie" (words: Óttarr Proppé, music: Sigurjón Kjartansson)
"Forbidden Lovers" (words: Óttarr Proppé, music: Sigurjón Kjartansson)
"Death" (words: Óttarr Proppé, music: Sigurjón Kjartansson)

Personnel
Sigurjón Kjartansson - Vocals, guitars, producer
Óttar Proppé - Vocals
S. Björn Blöndal - Bass, guitar, producer
Hallur Ingólfsson - Drums
Ævar Ísberg - Drums (on tracks 4 & 9)
Jón Egill Eyþórsson - Guitar (on track 9)
Sveinn Kjartansson - Engineer, co-producer

1989 albums
One Little Independent Records albums